The 2021 Anchorage mayoral election was held on April 6, 2021, to elect the mayor of Anchorage, Alaska. As no candidate received at least 45% of the vote in the first round, the two candidates with the highest vote share, Forrest Dunbar and Dave Bronson, advanced to a runoff on May 11. The election was officially nonpartisan. Incumbent independent acting mayor Austin Quinn-Davidson, first appointed to the position in October 2020, was eligible to run for reelection to a full term, but did not run. The deadline to register to vote in the first round was March 7. Mail-in ballots were sent out starting on March 15. On May 21, 2021, after a narrow loss, Dunbar conceded the race to Bronson. Bronson was sworn in on July 1.

Background
Ethan Berkowitz was elected mayor in 2015 and 2018 and was ineligible to run for a third term. On October 13, 2020, he announced his resignation through his chief of staff Jason Bockenstadt at a meeting of the Anchorage Assembly, Anchorage's city council, to be effective October 23. The resignation came after a reporter made allegations that he was engaged in an inappropriate relationship with her. Felix Rivera, chair of the Anchorage Assembly, was next in the line of succession to the office. After a failed attempt immediately following the resignation announcement, the Assembly met in a special meeting on October 16 to reorganize itself, installing Austin Quinn-Davidson as Assembly chair with Rivera as vice-chair. This move allowed Quinn-Davidson to succeed to the office of mayor and allowed Rivera to retain his position presiding over Assembly meetings. Quinn-Davidson is both the first female and first openly gay mayor of Anchorage. On November 4, the Assembly voted not to hold a special election for the position of mayor, meaning that the next election for the seat would be the regularly scheduled one in 2021.

General election
In the leadup to the general election, it was widely believed that there would be a runoff between Dunbar and one of the more conservative candidates.

Candidates

Major candidates
Dave Bronson (Republican) - Former U.S. Air Force and commercial pilot
Forrest Dunbar (Democratic) - Member of the Anchorage Assembly (2016–present), member of the Alaska Army National Guard
Bill Evans (Independent) - Member of the Anchorage Assembly (2014–2017), board and two-time co-chair of the Anchorage Chamber of Commerce
Bill Falsey (Independent) - Anchorage Municipal Manager (2017–2020)
George Martinez (Democratic) - Educator, former special assistant to Ethan Berkowitz for economic development
Mike Robbins (Republican) - Businessman

Other registered candidates
Anna Anthony
Jeffrey Brown, social services worker
Darin Colbry (Republican), candidate for Governor of Alaska in 2018
Heather Herndon, real estate developer, construction, project manager, accountant, portfolio private placement financier.
Jacob Seth Kern (Democratic), perennial candidate
Reza Momin
Albert Swank Jr., civil engineer
Jacob Versteeg, compliance examiner
Joe Westfall

Withdrawn
Eric Croft (Democratic), former state representative, former member of the Anchorage Assembly, former president of the Anchorage School Board, and candidate for Governor of Alaska in 2006
Dustin Darden, maintenance worker and perennial candidate
Nelson Jesus Godoy, activist and candidate for mayor in 2018

Declined
Austin Quinn-Davidson (Independent), incumbent acting mayor

Endorsements

Fundraising

Debates
Five candidates did not participate in either debate: Anna Anthony, Darin Colbry, Jacob Seth Kern, Reza Momin, and Jacob Versteeg.

Polling

Results

Runoff
In the leadup to the runoff, third-place primary finisher Falsey and sixth-place finisher Martinez endorsed Dunbar, while fifth-place finisher Robbins endorsed Bronson. Fourth-place finisher Evans did not make an endorsement.

Endorsements

Polling

Results

Notes

References

External links
Official campaign websites
Dave Bronson (R) for Mayor 
Forrest Dunbar (D) for Mayor
Bill Evans (I) for Mayor 
Bill Falsey (I) for Mayor 
Heather Herndon for Mayor 
George Martinez (D) for Mayor
Mike Robbins (R) for Mayor 

2021 United States mayoral elections
2021 Alaska elections
2021